Deepti Omchery Bhalla is an artist from India in singing and dancing.

Life
She was trained in these skills by her mother Leela Omchery, a carnatic singer. She is an exponent of Mohiniyattam, a classical dance form from Kerala, India. She learnt Mohiniattam, the female classical solo dance from Kalamandalam Kalyanikutty Amma. She is Professor in Carnatic Music at the Faculty of Music and Fine Arts, University of Delhi. She received the Kerala Sangeetha Nataka Akademi Award in 2006, and the Sangeet Natak Akademi Award in 2007.

References

External links 
 Official website of Dr. Deepti Omcherry Bhalla

See also 
Kalamandalam Kalyanikutty Amma

Indian female classical dancers
Performers of Indian classical dance
Indian dance teachers
Living people
Dancers from Kerala
Mohiniyattam exponents
Recipients of the Sangeet Natak Akademi Award
Year of birth missing (living people)
Indian women choreographers
Indian choreographers
Women artists from Kerala
20th-century Indian dancers
20th-century Indian women artists
Recipients of the Kerala Sangeetha Nataka Akademi Award